Mississippi Highway 397 (MS 397) is a  state highway in eastern Mississippi. Running generally in a southeast to northwest direction, it is signed north--south traveling from the De Kalb vicinity at MS 16 to Louisville at MS 14.

Route description
The state highway begins west of De Kalb along MS 16. MS 397 heads northwest through barren forest land as a two-lane  speed limit highway. First, an access road to Kemper Lake intersects the highway, later Sinai Road branches off the highway providing access to a small settlement. Continuing northwest, MS 397 intersects the northern end of unsigned MS 493 and a second access road to Kemper Lake. About  later, it reaches the northern terminus of MS 495. Then about  after that, MS 397 reaches the settlement of Preston which has an intersection with MS 21, some houses, and a pair of stores.

To the north of Preston, MS 397 heads through more woodlands, though as it approaches the Winston County line, some open fields appear along the road. After entering Winston County, MS 397 heads northwest through a mix of woods and fields. The highway passes Nanih Waiya High School, and a small traveler stop. At the settlement of Vernon, MS 490 breaks off to head southwest while MS 397 continues northwest. It passes more woodlands and field mix as well as a hunting lodge and lake. As it enters the city of Louisville, the road name officially becomes E John C. Stennis Drive. It passes a few clusters of houses, a cemetery, and small businesses. MS 397 curves to the due west, crosses S Columbus Avenue, and becomes W John C. Stennis Drive for the next block. At the next intersection, S Church Avenue, MS 397 turns north onto it through Louisville's central business district. The highway ends at MS 14 which carries Main Street in the city.

History
A state highway connecting De Kalb and Louisville had existed since 1940. By 1950, with the portion of the road in Winton County being fully paved, was given the designation of MS 397. The remaining portion of MS 397 was paved by 1955.

Major intersections

References

External links

397
Transportation in Kemper County, Mississippi
Transportation in Winston County, Mississippi